The Mexican Secretariat of Foreign Affairs (SRE, lit: Secretariat of External Relations) is the government department responsible for Mexico's foreign affairs.

Mexico currently has 80 embassies, 33 consulates-general, 35 consulates, 1 representative office in Ramallah, 1 trade office in Taiwan and 144 honorary consulates around the world. Mexico also has 2 permanent representations to the United Nations in New York City and Geneva, there are also permanent missions to the OAS in Washington, D.C., to UNESCO in Paris, to European Union in Brussels, to OECD in Paris, to ICAO in Montreal and to OPANAL in Mexico City. Mexico also has permanent observer mission status to the AU, CAN, CE, Mercosur, NAM and Unasur.

The person in charge of the Ministry of Foreign Affairs is the Secretary of Foreign Affairs, also known domestically as the canciller (Spanish, lit. chancellor).

The Secretary's offices are divided Undersecretary for Foreign Relations, Undersecretary Latin America and the Caribbean, Undersecretary for North America, Undersecretary for Multilateral Affairs and Human Rights, the Mexican Agency for International Development Cooperation (AMEXCID) and the Legal Counselor.

Functions
To direct the foreign service in its daily aspects in the diplomatic and consular tasks under the terms of the Law of the Mexican Foreign Service and, through the agents of the same service, to watch abroad for the good name of Mexico; Impart protection to Mexicans; Collect consular fees and other taxes; To exercise notarial functions, of Civil Registry, of judicial assistance and the other federal functions that the laws indicate, and acquire, manage and conserve the properties of the Nation abroad
To assist the commercial and tourist promotion of the country through its embassies and consulates
Train members of the Mexican Foreign Service in the commercial and tourist areas, so that they can fulfill the responsibilities derived from the provisions of the previous section.
To intervene in international commissions, congresses, conferences and exhibitions, and to participate in international organizations and institutes of which the Mexican government is a part
Intervene in matters related to the territorial limits of the country and international waters
To grant to the foreigners the licenses and authorizations that they require according to the laws to acquire the dominion of the lands, waters and their accessions in the Mexican Republic; Obtain concessions and enter into contracts, intervene in the exploitation of natural resources or to invest or participate in Mexican civil or mercantile societies, as well as to grant permits for the constitution of these or to amend its bylaws or to acquire real property or rights over them
Keeping track of the operations performed according to the previous fraction
Intervene on all issues related to nationality and naturalization
Save and use the Great Seal of the Nation
Collect autographs of all kinds of diplomatic documents
Legalize the signatures of documents that must produce effects abroad and foreign documents that must produce them in the Republic
To intervene, through the Attorney General of the Republic, in the extradition in accordance with the law or treaties, and in the international letters or letters rogatory to get them to their destination, after examining that they fulfill the formal requirements for their diligence and Its origin or unlawfulness, to make it known to the competent judicial authorities
The others that expressly attribute the laws and regulations

List of secretaries

References

External links 
SRE

Cabinet of Mexico
Foreign relations of Mexico
Mexico
1821 establishments in Mexico
Foreign Affairs